Thanassis "Sakis" Moustakidis (Greek: Θανάσης "Σάκης" Μουστακίδης, born ) is a former Greek male volleyball player and current volleyball coach. He was part of the Greece men's national volleyball team that won the bronze medal at the 1987 European Championship in Belgium. He played for Olympiacos for 9 years (1987–1996), winning numerous titles.

Clubs
 Evros Soufliou (-1976)
  Aris (1976-1987)
  Olympiacos (1987-1996)
  AEK (1996-1998)
  Ethnikos Alexandroupolis V.C. (1998-2002)

References

External links
 Profile at greekvolley.com

1962 births
Living people
Greek men's volleyball players
Olympiacos S.C. players
Aris V.C. players
People from Evros (regional unit)
Sportspeople from Eastern Macedonia and Thrace